Salehabad Rural District is a rural district (dehestan) in Salehabad District, Bahar County, Hamadan Province, Iran. At the 2006 census, its population was 10,767, in 2,438 families. The rural district has 11 villages.

References 

Rural Districts of Hamadan Province
Bahar County